Min Yoon-gi (born March 9, 1993), better known by his stage names, Suga and Agust D, is a South Korean rapper, songwriter, and record producer. Managed by Big Hit Music, he has been a member of South Korean boy band BTS since 2013, but worked as a producer prior to joining the group. Nicknamed "The Hand of Midas" by Korean media for making commercially successful songs, he has worked with artists such as Suran, Epik High, IU, and Coldplay.

Songs

See also
 List of songs written by Suga

Notes

References

Suga
 *
Suga